Dvorje is a small settlement in the Municipality of Moravče in central Slovenia. The area is part of the traditional region of Upper Carniola. It is now included with the rest of the municipality in the Central Slovenia Statistical Region.

Name
Dvorje was attested in historical sources as Dewoͤryach in 1341 and Wuͦr in 1468.

References

External links

Dvorje on Geopedia

Populated places in the Municipality of Moravče